Sabine Land is a land area on the east coast of Spitsbergen, Svalbard. It is named after explorer General Sir Edward Sabine. Among the glaciers in the area is the  Nordmannsfonna glacier.

References

Geography of Svalbard
Spitsbergen